Lotta Immonen (born 22 March 1996) is a Finnish curler. She is a two-time Finnish women's champion (2018, 2019), four-time Finnish mixed curling champion (2018, 2019, 2020, 2022) and a one-time Finnish mixed doubles champion (2022).

Teams

Women's

Mixed

Mixed doubles

References

External links
 

Living people
1996 births
Finnish female curlers
Finnish curling champions